Global surveillance and journalism is a subject covering journalism or reporting of governmental espionage, which gained worldwide attention after the Global surveillance disclosures of 2013 that resulted from Edward Snowden's leaks. Since 2013, many leaks have emerged from different government departments in the US, which confirm that the National Security Agency (NSA) spied on US citizens and foreign enemies alike. Journalists were attacked for publishing the leaks and were regarded in the same light as the whistleblowers who gave them the information. Subsequently, the US government made arrests, raising concerns about the freedom of the press.

A whistleblower is someone, particularly an insider or employee of a company, who brings to light wrongdoing by an employer, a government, or a law-enforcement agency, and who is commonly vested by statute with rights and remedies against retaliation.

US "war against whistleblowers"
The Obama administration was characterized as much more aggressive than the Bush and other previous administrations in its response to whistleblowing and leaks to the press, prompting critics to describe Obama's crackdown as a battle against whistleblowers.  A public statement by the Obama campaign said that "the Obama administration has prosecuted twice as many cases under the Espionage Act as all the other administrations combined. Eight people have been charged under previously rarely used leak-related provisions of the Espionage Act of 1917.

Four NSA whistleblowers 

In 2011, the Department of Defense's Office of the Inspector General declassified documents which are the only response to the four whistleblowers' claims. The documents further explore NSA responsibility for wasting resources on the failed attempt at Trailblazer.

Stephen Jin-Woo Kim, a State Department contractor who reportedly had a conversation about North Korea with James Rosen of Fox News and Jeffrey Sterling, an alleged source for James Risen's book [[State of War: The Secret History of the CIA and the Bush Administration|State of War]]. Risen has also been subpoenaed to reveal his sources, a rare action by the government. Shamai Leibowitz, a contract linguist for the Federal Bureau of Investigation (FBI), was convicted of leaking information from embassy wiretaps. Like John Kiriakou, he is serving a thirty-month prison term for disclosing that intelligence officers were using torture. Many whistleblowers witness serious crimes and are severely punished when they expose them, but the perpetrators of the original misdeeds are not held accountable.

United States v. Manning

Background 
Chelsea Manning was a United States Army soldier convicted in 2013 for illegally downloading military reports that were unclassified and sensitive military documents. The documents were from both wars where the US was involved: in Iraq and Afghanistan. Manning had acquired the documents on the military base in Baghdad.

Manning provided Wikileaks with evidence of Collateral Murder when the US Army killed 12 unarmed citizens with an Apache attack helicopter. The attack happened in a Baghdad suburb and two Reuters staff were among the victims. Manning commented on the video, finding the "delightful bloodlust" the soldiers appeared to have disturbing. As seen on the footage and aerial weapons team asks a wounded Iraqi to hold up a gun so that they could have reason to engage.

On August 21, 2013, Manning was sentenced to thirty-five years in prison for providing sensitive documents to WikiLeaks. She only served seven years before President Barack Obama commuted her sentence in 2017. While in prison, Manning attempted to take her life twice over her struggles with gender dysphoria and attempts to get a gender reassignment.

Other notable whistleblowers 

James Hitselberger, a former contract linguist for the US Navy in Bahrain is charged with possessing classified documents. Edward Snowden, a technical contractor for the NSA and former employee of the Central Intelligence Agency (CIA), is currently at large and has been charged with theft and the unauthorized disclosure of classified information to columnist Glenn Greenwald.
 
Reporters Without Borders' 2014 Press Freedom Index saw a drop of 13 ranks for the United States due to her "treatment of whistleblowers, leakers, and those who assist them" in 2013. The country fell to 46th place, between Romania and Haiti. The United Kingdom fell three places for similar reasons. The Index is meant to highlight places where journalists and photographers are free to do their work, as well as places where the work puts them in danger. Reporters Without Borders' executive director Christian Mihr stated: "In the US, state persecution of investigative journalists and their sources by security services has reached an unprecedented level. If sources can no longer be trusted, we face a significant curtailment of press freedom and a dramatic step backward when it comes to democracy."

Allegations of government intimidation of The Guardian
The Guardian is a UK-based newspaper with an international reach. In 2013, The Guardian received a copy of data from NSA whistleblower Edward Snowden.

Legal threats and forced computer destruction

In June and July 2013, Prime Minister David Cameron sent Jeremy Heywood, the Cabinet Secretary, to meet with Alan Rusbridger, editor of The Guardian.  Accordingly, Heywood ordered the editor to cease publishing articles based on the Snowden disclosures. According to The Guardian, Heywood said: "We can do this nicely or we can go to law", adding that "A lot of people in government think you should be closed down".

On July 20, the destruction of computer hard-drives was carried out by several Guardian staff members under the observation of experts from GCHQ.

The Guardian said the authorities were told of the existence of multiple copies of the data outside the UK. The deputy editor, Paul Johnson, who was involved in the destruction told Luke Harding about the experience. "It was purely a symbolic act", Johnson said. "We knew that. GCHQ knew that. And the government knew that. It was the most surreal event I have witnessed in British journalism".

Arrest of David Miranda 

In August 2013, the Metropolitan Police detained Greenwald's partner David Miranda at London's Heathrow Airport under Schedule 7 of the Terrorism Act 2000, while he was traveling home from Berlin.  A February 2014 court decision upheld the detention as appropriate.

Greenwald described his partner's detention as "clearly intended to send a message of intimidation to those of us who have been reporting on the NSA and GCHQ". Miranda was detained for nine hours and his laptop and other items were seized. He has since sued the Metropolitan Police for misuse of their powers. According to The Guardian, the claim "challenging controversial powers used under schedule 7 to the Terrorism Act 2000, maintains that Miranda was not involved in terrorism and says his right to freedom of expression was curtailed".

In December 2013, Greenwald and Miranda openly advocated for asylum in Brazil for Edward Snowden in exchange for the fugitive
leaker's cooperation in investigating the NSA. Brazil responded by saying that it was not interested in investigating the NSA.

Julian Assange and WikiLeaks 
In 2006 Wikileaks was created by Julian Assange and the goal for Wikileaks is to capture the truth by any means, which has put them in the International Spotlight over the years. Since its birth, Wikileaks has released classified documents regarding the war effort in the Middle East, documents regarding the detainees in Guantanamo Bay, and releasing emails from Democratic National Committee staffers.

U.S Crackdown on Assange 
On April 11, 2019, Assange was arrested after being taken from the Ecuadorian embassy. The U.S Justice Department believes that with the position of Wikileaks during the 2016 elections, he, Julian Assange, had a key role in the Russian attack on the 2016 elections. During the same election, Assange had released DNC staff flies as well, which many believe that he released them because the next day was a democratic election. Soon after, a DNC staffer named Seth Rich was murdered and was believed to be leaking the e-mails. Also, the U.S Department of Defense believes that Assange had conspired with Chelsea Manning in cracking a password that was on a U.S Department of Defense computer, which is stored on a U.S government network and she had downloaded 1,000 classified documents.

Journalists as accomplices
Director Clapper has referred to Snowden's "accomplices", while Rep. Peter King explicitly accused Greenwald of having Snowden as an "accomplice".  UK Conservative politician Liam Fox has contacted the UK Director of Public Prosecutions to consider whether journalists at The Guardian "breached counter-terrorism laws".

Pressure from the NSA
Computer Science Professor Matthew Green of Johns Hopkins University posted a statement critical of the NSA.  The university issued a statement it had "received information that Matthew Green's blog contained a link or links to classified material", after which it asked him to remove the post. Following this, the NSA's logo was removed and the material was published in many different news outlets so the Interim Dean, Andrew Douglas, will have the post restored.

References

Surveillance
Journalism
Global ethics